William Powell (1892–1984) and Myrna Loy (1905–1993) starred in 13 movies together in the 1930s and '40s. Loy also had an uncredited cameo in their 14th and last film together, The Senator Was Indiscreet, which starred Powell. 

Their frequent pairing - always playing a couple - and on-screen chemistry, especially in their six popular Thin Man films, where they played husband and wife Nick and Nora Charles, led many fans to believe they were married in real life. However, they were only good friends. In a 1988 interview, she explained, "I think we were too much alike for a romance."

Powell was already a well-established leading man in Hollywood prior to their teaming, dating back to the silent era, but it was the great success of The Thin Man that made Loy a star. She almost did not get the role. Louis B. Mayer had already cast her in Stamboul Quest, and only agreed to let her play Nora Charles if the picture could be shot in three weeks. Director W. S. "One Take Woody" Van Dyke only needed 16 days for shooting and two for retakes. A B movie, The Thin Man was a box office and critical hit.

Filmography

References

Powell and Loy